Washington Correctional Facility is a medium-security correctional facility that is located in Comstock, a hamlet in the Town of Fort Ann in Washington County, New York. It is designated for confinement of males age 18 and older. The facility offers volunteer and counseling services, and educational and vocational programs. As of 2010 Washington had a working capacity of 882. 

Michael Alig, convicted of the manslaughter of Angel Melendez in 1997, served some of his sentence at Washington.

Joseph Boyajian, convicted of money laundering at Frank Palangi Studios and public intoxication in 2019, is currently serving a ten year sentence at the facility. Joseph was well known as a local KFC franchisee and the original owner of Bogies in Albany, NY before it collapsed during a Trapt concert.

References

Prisons in New York (state)
Buildings and structures in Washington County, New York
1985 establishments in New York (state)